The 2022 Istanbul Rams season was the first and last season of the Istanbul Rams team in the second season of the European League of Football.

Preseason
After announcing the participation in the ELF and changing their name to Istanbul Rams, they presented their head coach Val Gunn at the October 20, 2021. Further additions to the coaching staff followed suit. The first player signings were introduced on November 2, 2021 with Zachary Blair. The Rams combine was held on the November 22, 2021.

Regular season

Standings

Schedule

Source: europeanleague.football

Roster

Staff

Notes

References 

Istanbul Rams
Istanbul Rams
Rams